Dr. Alois Wollenmann House is a historic home located at Ferdinand, Dubois County, Indiana.  It was built in 1903, and is a two-story, roughly square, frame Swiss Cottage style dwelling.  It has American Craftsman detailing and features decorative shingles and turned balustrades and brackets.  It has a one-story rear addition housing a kitchen and sunroom.

It was added to the National Register of Historic Places in 2013.

References

Houses on the National Register of Historic Places in Indiana
Houses completed in 1903
Houses in Dubois County, Indiana
National Register of Historic Places in Dubois County, Indiana